Kožetin, is a Serbian village, situated in the municipality of Aleksandrovac, in the district of Rasina.  In 2002, it had a population of 907.

 

Villages in Serbia
Populated places in Rasina District